Pseudopontia australis is a butterfly in the family Pieridae. It is found in the Democratic Republic of the Congo, the Republic of the Congo and eastern Gabon.

References

Butterflies described in 1923
Pieridae